The Ministry of Aliyah and Integration (Ministry of Immigration and Absorption before 2017) (Misrad HaAliyah VeHaKlita) is a ministry of the Israeli government responsible for providing assistance to immigrants.

History
The Ministry was known until 1951 as the Ministry of Immigration (Misrad HaAliya, "Ministry of Aliyah") and later renamed , HaMisrad LeKlitat HaAliyah, "Ministry of Integration of Immigrants". Pnina Tamano-Shata, who was also the first Ethiopian Jew to serve as a minister in the Israeli government, was given the title of Minister of Immigrant Absorption when she was sworn in on 17 May 2020

Purpose
In coordination with local authorities and the Jewish Agency, the Ministry is responsible for helping new immigrants (olim) find employment and accommodation, and gives advice on education, planning and social issues, as well as setting up the "immigrant basket" of benefits (such as tax breaks, grants etc.).

Fake claims scandal
In 2019 a Times of Israel investigation found that all of the success stories on the ministry's Twitter page were invented, except for one person who was not an immigrant. The ministry acknowledged the fabrication and removed them all.

List of ministers
The Minister of Immigration and Absorption (Sar HaAliyah VeKlita) is a minor portfolio in the Israeli cabinet. There is also occasionally a Deputy Minister.

Deputy ministers

References

External links

Aliyah
Ministry of Aliyah
Aliyah
Aliyah
Aliyah